Southend is a hamlet, in the civil parish of Turville (where at the 2011 Census the population was included ) near to the village of the same name in Buckinghamshire, England. It lies in the Chiltern Hills at an elevation of 188m near the Oxfordshire border above and to the west of the Hambleden Valley.

There are some houses and cottages around a rough village green and two small ponds.

Hamlets in Buckinghamshire